WSVE was a radio station licensed in Jacksonville, Florida. WSVE was owned by Willis & Sons. WSVE last operated on 1280 kHz with 5,000 watts of power daytime & 133 watts nighttime.

History

As WIVY
WIVY started broadcasting on 1050 kilohertz in August 1948.  Its initial power was 1,000 watts, daytime only.  It was affiliated with MacGregor, World & Hearst's INS.  In 1971 it held a construction permit to move to 1280 kHz and in increase power from 1,000 watts daytime-only to 5,000 watts daytime-only.  It also spawned WIVY-FM/102.9 in 1965.  It changed callsigns to WEXI circa 1976.

As WEXI
When WIVY changed calls to WEXI, WIVY-FM remained under its old callsign.  WIVY/1280 aired a contemporary music format.  It switched to all-news by 1978.  WEXI became WXOZ circa 1985.

Willis & Sons
Bishop Levi Willis, Sr.'s Willis & Sons, Inc. bought the station on July 14, 1986.  It was by then WXOZ with a children's educational format.  On March 14, 1987 it became WSVE.

Leaving the air
Stemming from a 1999 FCC investigation, Willis was fined over $84,000 in fines from the regulatory agency. Partially to satisfy this debt, Willis agreed to surrender the licenses of 4 stations: WSVE, WCRY, KVLA and KLRG. Of those 4 stations, KLRG is still on the air under different ownership.

References

External links
DWSVE's CDBS page.
DWSVE's callsign page.

SVE (defunct)
Defunct radio stations in the United States
Radio stations established in 1948
Radio stations disestablished in 2004
Defunct companies based in Florida
1948 establishments in Florida
2004 disestablishments in Florida
Defunct religious radio stations in the United States
SVE